Ain Saar (born 8 August 1968) is a Võro punk rocker, and freedom fighter, the leader of the group Vaba-Sõltumatu Noorte Kolonn Nr.1 (Free Independent Youth Column No. 1) of December 20, 1987, which struggled against the Soviet rule. He was exiled in 1988 by the authorities of Estonian SSR to Sweden where he lived in Skarpnäck, Stockholm.

In 2006, he campaigned for the removal of the Bronze Soldier of Tallinn.

References

External links
Intsident sinimustvalge värvikombinatsiooniga"Eesti Päevaleht"
intervjuu "Ain Saar jagab tunnustust oma toetajatega" "Võrumaa Teatajas"
Vaba-Sõltumatu Kolonni Nr 1 juht sai teenetemärgi"Eesti Ekspressis"
Aavo Savitschi artikkel "Ain Saar ja tema ajastu" "Võrumaa Teatajas"
Vaba-Sõltumatu Noortekolonni liider
ERLi liikmeid ja toetajaid 
 Eesti Rahvuslikku Liikumist tahetakse näha avatud demokraatliku liikumisena 
Mis on juhtunud meie wabaduse eest werd walanud Sõltumatu kolonni nr. 1 juhiga – Ain Saarega?
Riho Nassar
Vaba-Sõltumatu Kolonn Nr. 1
Sinimustvalge taassünd
Demokraatiat ohustab passiivsus

Living people
Anarcho-punk musicians
Estonian dissidents
Soviet dissidents
Estonian emigrants to Sweden
1968 births